Abdul-Basit Adam (born 13 February 1995, Kumasi, Ghana) is a Ghanaian professional footballer who plays as a forward.

References

External links

1995 births
Living people
Association football forwards
Ghanaian footballers
Ghanaian expatriate footballers
Allsvenskan players
Superettan players
South African Premier Division players
New Edubiase United F.C. players
Free State Stars F.C. players
Giresunspor footballers
Gefle IF players
IK Frej players
Dardanelspor footballers
Ghanaian expatriate sportspeople in Turkey
Ghanaian expatriate sportspeople in Sweden
Ghanaian expatriate sportspeople in South Africa
Expatriate footballers in Turkey
Expatriate footballers in Sweden
Expatriate soccer players in South Africa
Footballers from Kumasi